Sander Rozema (born 19 June 1987) is a Dutch former professional footballer. He formerly played as a midfielder for FC Groningen, FC Zwolle, SC Veendam and FC Emmen. 

Rozema retired in 2017 after struggling with recurrent knee injuries.

References

External links
 Voetbal International profile 

1987 births
Living people
Dutch footballers
FC Groningen players
PEC Zwolle players
SC Veendam players
FC Emmen players
Eredivisie players
Eerste Divisie players
People from Noordenveld

Association football midfielders
Footballers from Drenthe